Thomas Jenkinson was an English professional footballer who played as an outside left.

Career
Born in Bradford, Jenkinson signed for Bradford City in April 1914 from Wapping, leaving the club in 1916 to play local football. During his time with Bradford City he made one appearance in the Football League.

Sources

References

Year of birth missing
Date of death missing
English footballers
Bradford City A.F.C. players
English Football League players
Association football outside forwards